Dallas/Fort Worth International Airport , also known as DFW Airport, is the primary international airport serving the Dallas–Fort Worth metroplex and the North Texas Region in the U.S. state of Texas.

It is the largest hub for American Airlines, which is headquartered near the airport, and is the third-busiest airport in the world by aircraft movements and the second-busiest airport by passenger traffic in 2021, according to the Airports Council International. It is the ninth-busiest international gateway in the United States and the second-busiest international gateway in Texas (behind Houston-IAH). American Airlines at DFW is the second-largest single airline hub in the world and the United States, behind Delta Air Liness hub in Atlanta.

Located roughly halfway between the major cities of Dallas and Fort Worth, DFW spills across portions of Dallas and Tarrant counties and includes portions of the cities of Grapevine, Irving, Euless, and Coppell. At , DFW is the second-largest airport by land area in the United States after Denver International Airport. It has its own post office ZIP Code, 75261, and United States Postal Service city designation ("DFW Airport, TX"), as well as its own police, fire protection, and emergency medical services.

As of June 2022, DFW Airport has service to 260 destinations (193 domestic + 67 international) from 28 scheduled airlines. In surpassing 200 destinations, DFW joined a small group of airports worldwide with that distinction.

In April 2022, DFW Airport was ranked as the second-busiest airport in the world with 62.5 million passengers in 2021.

History

Planning
As early as 1927, before the area had an airport, Dallas proposed a joint airport with Fort Worth. Fort Worth declined the offer and thus each city opened its own airport, Love Field and Meacham Field, each of which had scheduled airline service.

In 1940, the Civil Aeronautics Administration earmarked  for the construction of a Dallas/Fort Worth Regional Airport. American Airlines and Braniff Airways struck a deal with the city of Arlington to build an airport there, but the governments of Dallas and Fort Worth disagreed over its construction and the project was abandoned in 1942. After World War II, Fort Worth annexed the site and developed it into Amon Carter Field with the help of American Airlines. In 1960, Fort Worth purchased Amon Carter Field and renamed it Greater Southwest International Airport (GSW) in an attempt to compete with Dallas' airport, but GSW's traffic continued to decline relative to Dallas Love Field. By the mid-1960s, Fort Worth was getting 1% of Texas air traffic while Dallas was getting 49%, which led to the virtual abandonment of GSW.

The joint airport proposal was revisited in 1961 after the Federal Aviation Administration (FAA) refused to invest more money in separate Dallas and Fort Worth airports. While airline service had steeply declined at both GSW and Meacham, Dallas Love Field was congested and had no more room to expand. Following an order from the federal government in 1964 that it would unilaterally choose a site if the cities could not come to an agreement, officials from the two cities finally agreed on a location for a new regional airport that was north of the near-abandoned GSW and almost equidistant from the two city centers. The land was purchased by the cities in 1966 and construction began in 1969.

Voters went to the polls in cities throughout the Dallas–Fort Worth metroplex to approve the new North Texas Regional Airport, which was named after the North Texas Commission that was instrumental in the regional airport coming to fruition. The North Texas Commission formed the North Texas Airport Commission to oversee the planning and construction of the giant airport. Area voters approved the airport referendum and the new North Texas Regional Airport would become a reality. However, many Dallas residents remained satisfied with Love Field, and an attempt to establish an independent Dallas Fort Worth Regional Airport Authority—despite strong backing from the Dallas Chamber of Commerce and Dallas mayor J. Erik Jonsson—failed when Dallas voters rejected the proposal by a narrow margin. After further negotiation, the cities instead established an appointed airport board consisting of seven members from Dallas and four from Fort Worth and were able to persuade all existing air carriers at Love and GSW to move to the new regional airport.

Under the original 1967 airport design, DFW was to have pier-shaped terminals perpendicular to a central highway. In 1968, the design was revised to provide for semicircular terminals, which served to isolate loading and unloading areas from the central highway, and to provide additional room for parking in the middle of each semicircle. The plan proposed thirteen such terminals, but only four were built initially.

Opening and operations

DFW held an open house and dedication ceremony on September 20–23, 1973, which included the first landing of a supersonic Concorde in the United States, an Air France aircraft en route from Caracas to Paris. The attendees at the airport's dedication included former Texas Governor John Connally, Transportation Secretary Claude Brinegar, U.S. Senator Lloyd Bentsen and Texas Governor Dolph Briscoe. The airport opened for commercial service as Dallas/Fort Worth Regional Airport on January 13, 1974, at a cost of $700 million. At the time of DFW's opening, at 17,500 acres (27.3 sq mi), it was the largest airport in the world ever constructed in terms of land area (surpassed in October 1975 with the opening of Montréal-Mirabel International Airport). The first flight to land was American Airlines Flight 341 from New York, which had stopped in Memphis and Little Rock. The surrounding cities began to annex the airport property into their city limits shortly after the airport was developed. The name change to Dallas/Fort Worth International did not occur until 1985.

An innovative feature of the airport during its early history was the Vought Airtrans, the world's first operational fully automated people mover system.

When it opened, DFW had four terminals, numbered 2W, 2E, 3E and 4E. During its first year of operations, the airport was served by American Airlines, Braniff International Airways, Continental Airlines, Delta Air Lines, Eastern Air Lines, Frontier Airlines, Ozark Air Lines, Rio Airways and Texas International Airlines. The Wright Amendment of 1979 banned long-distance flights into Love Field, leaving Southwest Airlines as Love Field's only jet airline and operating solely as an intrastate air carrier in the state of Texas.

Braniff International Airways was a major operator at DFW in the airport's early years, operating a hub from Terminal 2W with international flights to South America and Mexico from 1974, London from 1978, and Europe and Asia from 1979, before ceasing all operations in 1982. During the Braniff hub era, DFW was one of only four U.S. airports to have scheduled Concorde service; Braniff commenced scheduled Concorde service from Dallas to Washington from 1979 to 1980, using British Airways and Air France aircraft temporarily re-registered to Braniff while flying within the United States. British Airways later briefly flew Concordes to Dallas in 1988 as a substitute for its ordinarily scheduled DC-10 service.

Following airline deregulation, American Airlines (which had already been one of the largest carriers serving the Dallas/Fort Worth area for many years) established its first hub at DFW on June 11, 1981. American finished moving its headquarters from Grand Prairie, Texas, to a building in Fort Worth located on the site of the old Greater Southwest International Airport, near DFW Airport on January 17, 1983; the airline began leasing the facility from the airport, which owns the facility. By 1984, the American hub occupied most of Terminal 3E and part of Terminal 2E. American's hub grew to fill all of Terminal 2E by 1991. American also began long-haul international service from DFW, adding flights to London in 1982 and Tokyo in 1987.

Delta Air Lines also built up a hub operation at DFW, which occupied most of Terminal 4E through the 1990s. The Delta hub peaked around 1991, when Delta had a 35% market share at DFW; its share was halved by 2004, after many of its mainline routes were downgraded to more frequent regional jet service in 2003. Delta constructed a satellite terminal in Terminal E in 1988 to accommodate their hub, which was permanently reopened in May 2019 for American Eagle operations. Delta closed its DFW hub in 2004 in a restructuring of the airline to avoid bankruptcy, cutting its DFW operation to only 21 flights a day from over 250 and redeploying aircraft to hubs in Cincinnati, Atlanta and Salt Lake City. Prior to the closure, Delta had a 17.3% market share at DFW.

In 1989 the airport authority announced plans to rebuild the existing terminals and add two runways. After an environmental impact study was released the following year, the cities of Irving, Euless and Grapevine sued the airport over its extension plans, a battle that was finally decided (in favor of the airport) by the US Supreme Court in 1994. The seventh runway opened in 1996. The first, 17R/35L, was extended in 1996 (at the same time the new runway was constructed) and the other three (17C/35C, 18L/36R, and 18R/36L) were extended in 2005.

Terminal D, built for international flights, and DFW Skylink, a modern bidirectional people mover system, opened in 2005. The remaining Airport Train system, which had been mostly replaced by buses in 2003, had been fully decommissioned weeks earlier. In September 2014, the largest commercial aircraft in the world, an Airbus A380 owned by Australian airline Qantas, made the first arrival at DFW ever by an A380, and was handled at Concourse D.

From 2004 to 2012, DFW was one of two US Army "Personnel Assistance Points" that received US troops returning from wars in Iraq and Afghanistan for rest and recuperation. This ended on March 14, 2012, leaving Hartsfield–Jackson Atlanta International Airport as the sole Personnel Assistance Point.

Airports Council International (ACI) named DFW Airport the best large airport with more than 40 million passengers in North America for passenger satisfaction in 2016.

In June 2018, DFW Airport opened a fully functioning, free standing emergency room on airport grounds, located in Southgate Plaza near the Airport Headquarters and Rental Car Center. With this opening, the facility became the first actual ER on an airport's property anywhere around the globe.

DFW Airport tentatively completed a $2.7 billion "Terminal Renewal and Improvement Program" (TRIP), which encompassed renovations of three of the original four terminals (A, B, and E). Work on the project began following the conclusion of Super Bowl XLV in February 2011. Terminal A was the first terminal to undergo these renovations, which were completed in January 2017 at a cost of about $1 billion. This was followed by the completion of Terminal E in August 2017 and Terminal B in December 2017. While Terminal C was originally part of the multibillion-dollar renovations, American Airlines in 2014 asked to delay renovations of the terminal. Terminal C is now slated to be renovated along with the project to construct a new terminal, Terminal F, to be completed sometime in 2025.

Future
On May 20, 2019, DFW Airport and American Airlines announced plans to build a sixth terminal. The proposed project is estimated to cost $3–3.5 billion and was expected to finish as soon as 2025. Along with the addition of up to 24 new gates to Terminal F, renovations of Terminal C are planned to take place, as it is the last terminal that has not been updated in recent years. The goal of the new terminal is to "provide the region with the growth it needs to compete with international business centers," according to CEO of DFW Airport, Sean Donohue. However, due to the COVID-19 pandemic, the timing of the project is currently in flux.

On November 3, 2022, Frontier Airlines announced that it will establish a crew operating base at DFW for up to 340 pilots and flights attendants in early 2023, and will add a gate in Terminal E to accommodate flights to additional destinations starting in April of that year.

Composition and facilities

Terminals
Dallas/Fort Worth International Airport has five terminals and 174 gates; these terminals are in the City of Grapevine. DFW's terminals are designed in a half-circle shape, which minimizes the distance between a passenger's car and airplane, and to reduce traffic on main airport roads. The DFW Skylink automated people mover system allows passengers to quickly travel between gates inside the secured area of the airport, with an average travel time of seven minutes. 

Terminal D is the airport's primary international terminal, with CBP (Customs and Border Protection) facilities to process arriving international passengers, and has a gate capable of accommodating an Airbus A380. American Airlines has a presence in every terminal at DFW, while overseas airlines operate out of Terminal D and other domestic carriers use Terminal E.

Terminal A has 26 gates.
Terminal B has 45 gates (35 in the main terminal and 10 in a satellite building).
Terminal C has 29 gates. 
Terminal D has 33 gates.
Terminal E has 41 gates (26 in the main terminal and 15 in a satellite building).

Hotels 
There are two Hyatt branded hotels located in the central terminal area. 

The Hyatt Regency was built in the 1980s and has 811 rooms,  of meeting space and four food and beverage outlets. The hotel is located adjacent to Terminal C, with shuttle buses connecting to all terminals.

The Grand Hyatt opened in 2005 and has 298 rooms,  of meeting space and three food and beverage outlets. The hotel is located directly above Terminal D, with direct access to the check-in area.

Ground transportation

The DFW Airport area is served by International Parkway (partially State Highway 97 Spur), which runs through the center of the airport, connecting to Airport Freeway (State Highway 183) on the southern side of the airport and John W. Carpenter Freeway (State Highway 114) on the northern side. International Parkway continues north of State Highway 114, carrying the State Highway 121 designation for a short while until its interchange with the Lyndon B. Johnson Freeway (I-635), where State Highway 121 continues north as the Sam Rayburn Tollway.

Bus routes serving the airport are operated by Dallas Area Rapid Transit (DART) and Trinity Metro. DART operates route 230 from Downtown Irving/Heritage Crossing Station and Southwestern Medical District/Parkland Station to the Remote South Parking facility, and Trinity Metro operates the TRE Link bus route from CentrePort/DFW Airport station.

Three rail systems serve the airport: DART Light Rail, TEXRail, and the Trinity Railway Express.
TEXRail is a commuter rail service between Terminal B and T&P Station in downtown Fort Worth.  DFW Airport is additionally served by the Trinity Railway Express commuter rail line at CentrePort/DFW Airport Station via shuttle bus to the Remote South parking lot. The line serves both downtown Dallas and downtown Fort Worth. There  is also the DART Silver Line opening in 2024 which will serve terminal A.

A consolidated rental car facility is located at the south end of the airport and connected to all terminals by a dedicated network of shuttle buses. Hosting ten rental car companies, the center was completed in March 2000.

Other facilities
A cargo facility at 1639 West 23rd Street is located on the airport property and in the City of Grapevine. Tenants include China Airlines, Lufthansa Cargo, and the U.S. Fish and Wildlife Service.

The DFW Airport Department of Public Safety provides the airport with its own police, fire protection, and emergency medical services.

The DFW International Airport headquarters is located nearby at 2400 Aviation Drive, DFW Airport, TX 75261.

In 1995, the airport opened Founders' Plaza, an observation park dedicated to the founders of DFW Airport. The site offered a panoramic view of the south end of the airport and hosted several significant events, including an employee memorial the day after the September 11 attacks in 2001 and the airport's 30th anniversary celebration in 2004. As part of the perimeter taxiway project, Founders' Plaza was closed in 2007 and moved to a new location surrounding a -tall beacon on the north side of the airport in 2008. The  plaza features a granite monument and sculpture, post-mounted binoculars, piped-in voices of air traffic controllers and shade pavilions. In 2010, a memorial honoring Delta Air Lines Flight 191 was dedicated at the plaza.

Airlines and destinations

Passenger

Cargo

Statistics

Top destinations

Airline market share

Annual traffic

Accidents and incidents
August 2, 1985: Delta Air Lines Flight 191, a Lockheed L-1011 on a Fort Lauderdale–Dallas/Fort Worth–Los Angeles route, crashed near the north end of runway 17L (now 17C) after encountering a severe microburst on final approach; the crash killed 8 of 11 crew members, 128 of 152 passengers on board and one person on the ground.
March 24, 1987: The pilot of a Metroflight Convair CV-580, registration number N73107, operating for American Eagle Airlines bound for Gregg County Airport, lost directional control during a crosswind takeoff. The left-hand wing and propeller struck the runway and the nose landing gear collapsed as the craft slid onto an adjacent taxiway; eight passengers and three crew aboard the airliner suffered minor or no injuries. The crash was attributed to the pilot's decision to disregard wind information and take off in weather conditions that exceeded the rated capabilities of the aircraft; the pilot's "overconfidence in [his/her] personal ability" was cited as a contributing factor in the accident report.
May 21, 1988: An American Airlines McDonnell Douglas DC-10-30, registration number N136AA, operating as AA Flight 70 bound for Frankfurt Airport, overran runway 35L after warning signals prompted the flight crew to initiate a rejected takeoff. The jetliner continued to accelerate for several seconds and did not stop until it had run 1,100 feet (335 m) past the runway threshold, collapsing the nose landing gear. Two crew were seriously injured and the remaining 12 crew and 240 passengers escaped safely; the aircraft was severely damaged and was written off. Investigators attributed the overrun to a shortcoming in the design standards when the DC-10 was built; there had been no requirement to test whether worn (as opposed to new) brake pads were capable of stopping the aircraft during a rejected takeoff and eight of the ten worn pad sets failed.
August 31, 1988: Delta Air Lines Flight 1141, a Boeing 727, bound for Salt Lake City International Airport, crashed after takeoff, killing 14 of the 108 people on board and injuring 76 others.
April 14, 1993: The pilot of American Airlines Flight 102, a McDonnell Douglas DC-10-30, registration number N139AA, lost directional control during a crosswind landing in rain on arrival from Honolulu International Airport. The jetliner slid off runway 17L (now 17C) and dug into deep mud, collapsing the nose landing gear, tearing off the left-hand engine, and damaging the left wing. A fire in the left-hand wheel well was rapidly extinguished by firefighters. Two passengers suffered serious injuries while using the evacuation slides; the remaining 187 passengers and 13 crew evacuated safely. The aircraft was written off.
October 1, 1993: Martinaire Flight 639, a Cessna 208B Caravan cargo aircraft, registration number N9762B, was blown off runway 17L by jet blast after arriving from Tulsa International Airport, sustaining substantial damage to the left wing. The pilot and sole occupant was not injured. The pilot had disregarded a safety advisory from air traffic control and attempted to taxi behind a McDonnell Douglas MD-11 as it was cleared for takeoff.
July 18, 1997: A Cessna 172 allegedly stolen from Sherman Municipal Airport was unlawfully flown at very low altitude across DFW Airport, Fort Worth Alliance Airport, and the landing area at a Bell Helicopter facility, causing significant air traffic disruptions. The unknown pilot then flew the aircraft back to Sherman Municipal and parked it. The Cessna's owner denied flying it that day and stated that he could not positively identify the incident pilot because several people had access to the aircraft.
May 23, 2001: The right main landing gear of an American Airlines Fokker 100, registration number N1419D, operating as AA Flight 1107, collapsed upon landing on runway 17C after a scheduled flight from Charlotte/Douglas International Airport. The pilot was able to maintain directional control and stop the aircraft on the runway. The incident was attributed to metal fatigue caused by a manufacturing flaw in the right main gear; there were no serious injuries to the 88 passengers or 4 crew, but the aircraft was badly damaged and was written off.

See also

Transportation in Dallas

References

Notes

Citations

External links

 
Airports in the Dallas–Fort Worth metroplex
Economy of Dallas
Economy of Fort Worth, Texas
Airports in Tarrant County, Texas
Transportation in Dallas County, Texas
Airports established in 1974
1974 establishments in Texas
Coppell, Texas
Braniff